Solid Gold 68 is the thirty-fifth studio album by American guitarist Chet Atkins, released on RCA Victor LSP-4061. It is the first in a series of three albums providing Chet with the opportunity to interpret some of the pop hits of the year. It reached No. 18 on the Country Album charts.

Reception

Writing for Allmusic, critic Richard S.  Ginell wrote of the album "a mostly overproduced, perfunctory collection of period pop hits that does neither the guitarist nor the tunes much good."

Track listing

Side one
 "Slick" (Herb Alpert/Pisano)– 2:57
 "Lady Madonna" (Lennon–McCartney) – 2:30
 "Prayer Meetin'" (Smith) – 2:47
 "Sealed with a Kiss" (Peter Udell,  Gary Geld) – 2:31
 "Stoned Soul Picnic" (Laura Nyro) – 2:55
 "The Sounds of Silence" (Paul Simon) – 2:52

Side two
 "Mrs. Robinson" (Paul Simon) – 2:54
 "Harper Valley PTA" (Tom T. Hall) – 2:43
 "Light My Fire" (Densmore, Krieger, Manzarek, Morrison) – 3:05
 "Sleep Safe and Warm (Lullaby from Rosemary's Baby)" (Kusic–Snyder–Komeda) – 3:03
 "Grazing in the Grass" (Harry Elston, Philemon Hou)– 2:38
 "It Never Hurts to Ask" (Saussy) – 2:36

Personnel
Chet Atkins – guitar
Bill Walker, Cam Mullins – string arrangements

References

1968 albums
Chet Atkins albums
RCA Victor albums
Instrumental albums
Covers albums